The 1970 Soviet Chess Championship was the 38th edition of USSR Chess Championship. Held from 25 November to 28 December 1970 in Riga. Viktor Korchnoi  won his fourth title. The future world champion Anatoly Karpov had a quiet debut, beginning with a loss and 10 draws out of the first 11 rounds before beating Vladimir Bagirov in a Alekhine Defence in round 12. Mikhail Tal should have played in Riga, his home town, but he didn't. It looks as if the organizers doubted, on his recent illness history, whether he would last out the 21-rounder. It was a decision that was to rankle for years, especially since Tal was physically present, but had to confine himself to the press room.

Table and results

References 

USSR Chess Championships
Championship
Chess
1970 in chess
Chess